Head is a 1968 American satirical musical adventure film written and produced by Jack Nicholson and Bob Rafelson, directed by Rafelson, starring television rock group the Monkees (Davy Jones, Peter Tork, Micky Dolenz and Michael Nesmith) and distributed by Columbia Pictures.

During production, one of the working titles for the film was Changes, which was later the name of an album by the Monkees. Another working title was Untitled. A rough cut of the film was previewed for audiences in Los Angeles in the summer of 1968 under the title Movee Untitled.

The film featured Victor Mature as "The Big Victor" and cameo appearances by Nicholson, Teri Garr, Carol Doda, Annette Funicello, Frank Zappa, Sonny Liston, Timothy Carey, Percy Helton and Ray Nitschke. Also appearing on screen in brief non-speaking parts are Dennis Hopper and film choreographer Toni Basil.

Plot
Head begins at the dedication of the Gerald Desmond Bridge in Long Beach, California. As a local politician struggles with his microphone during the dedication speech, the Monkees (Micky Dolenz, Davy Jones, Peter Tork, and Michael Nesmith) suddenly interrupt the ceremony by running through the assembled officials to the sound of various horns and sirens. Micky then jumps off the bridge into the water below. He floats around, unconscious, as several mermaids attempt to revive him.

The scene then transitions into the living room at the Monkees pad, in which the Monkees are having a kissing contest with a young woman, who pronounces them all "even." Then a satiric version of the Monkees theme song plays, as the screen fills with images from the film, ending with the execution of Nguyễn Văn Lém followed by a woman screaming. However, the woman is not screaming in terror but in excitement, as the Monkees are about to take the stage at a concert. When the Monkees arrive, they lead the crowd in a cheer for "War!" which leads to a short war film, then transitions back to the concert stage where the group performs the song "Circle Sky". After the song, they are ripped apart by a rush of fans, but it quickly becomes clear that the Monkees are merely mannequins.

The movie meanders along, weaving through various (and mostly unrelated) sets, lots, and film genres, alternating between scenes with the group and scenes with individual members, interspersed with musical numbers and extended non sequiturs. Each Monkee takes a turn in the spotlight, experiencing confusion and dissatisfaction with his situation. Together, they repeatedly find themselves trapped in some form of enclosure, from a vacuum cleaner to a large black box (which Micky says represents their universe). When trapped, they are alone and spend their time trying to find a way out, but each time they escape they have little control over the situations they find themselves in. Any initiative they do take is invariably short-lived.

The film's main antagonist is the Big Victor. He seems to exist outside the film's universe, and when he does interact with it, he is not restricted by its physical limitations. The Big Victor appears sporadically throughout the film, and each character who sees him regards him with awe and fear.

Eventually, Peter discovers a swami he believes to have "the Answer", but when Peter shares his enlightenment with the rest of the group, Davy becomes enraged with Peter's conclusion: "I know nothing." Davy then goes on a rampage through the studio and the lot, eventually landing the group back inside the black box, which is then flown out to the desert. There they are released, only to face all their antagonists from the film.

After a chaotic romp, the Monkees flee on foot, ending up at the bridge dedication shown at the beginning of the film. This time, we see all four Monkees jump from the bridge, still pursued by their enemies. As each Monkee lands in the water below, he begins to swim away. However, they soon discover that they are actually trapped inside an aquarium on the back of a truck, which drives away, the Big Victor riding along with a smile as the credits roll.

Cast

 Peter Tork as Peter
 David Jones as Davy
 Micky Dolenz as Micky
 Michael Nesmith as Mike
 Annette Funicello as Teresa/Minnie
 Timothy Carey as Lord High 'n' Low
 Logan Ramsey as Officer Faye Lapid
 Abraham Sofaer as Swami
 Vito Scotti as I. Vitteloni
 Charles Macaulay as Inspector Shrink
 T. C. Jones as Mr. and Mrs. Ace
 Charles Irving as Mayor Feedback
 William Bagdad as Black Sheik
 Percy Helton as Heraldic Messenger
 Sonny Liston as Extra
 Ray Nitschke as Private One
 Carol Doda as Sally Silicone
 Frank Zappa as The Critic
 June Fairchild as The Jumper
 Teri Garr as Testy True
 I. J. Jefferson as Lady Pleasure
 Victor Mature as The Big Victor
 Toni Basil as 'Daddy's Song' Dancer
 Lee Kolima as Guard
 Terry Chambers as Hero
 Mike Burns as Nothing
 Esther Shepard as Mother
 Kristine Helstoski as Girl Friend
 John Hoffman as The Sexfiend
 Linda Weaver as Lover Secretary
 Jim Hanley as Frodis
 Dennis Hopper as himself (uncredited)
 Bob Rafelson as himself (uncredited)
 Jack Nicholson as Movie Director in Restaurant (uncredited)
 

Kolima's role is sometimes attributed to Tor Johnson, who does not appear in the film.

Production
The plot and peak moments of the film came from a weekend visit to an Ojai, California resort where the Monkees, Rafelson, and Nicholson brainstormed into a tape recorder, reportedly with the aid of a quantity of marijuana. Jack Nicholson then took the tapes and used them as the basis for his screenplay which (according to Rafelson) he structured while under the influence of LSD. When the band learned that they would not be allowed to direct themselves or to receive screenwriting credit, Dolenz, Jones, and Nesmith staged a one-day walkout, leaving Tork the only Monkee on the set the first day. The strike ended after the first day when, to mollify the Monkees, the studio agreed to a larger percentage share of the film's net for the group. But the incident damaged the Monkees' relationship with Rafelson and Bert Schneider, and would effectively end their professional relationship together.

Filmed from February 19 to May 17, 1968, at Columbia Pictures/Screen Gems Studios at Sunset & Gower, Hollywood, California and at the Columbia Ranch in Burbank, California as well as on various locations in California:
 Ribbon-cutting ceremony – Gerald Desmond Bridge, Long Beach, California
 Factory sequence – Hyperion Sewage Treatment Plant, Playa Del Rey
 Desert sequence – Palm Springs, California
 Concert sequence – Valley Music Hall, Salt Lake City
 Micky's underwater sequence – The Bahamas

The footage featuring actor Bela Lugosi saying the line "Supernatural, perhaps. Baloney, perhaps not" is sourced from the 1934 film The Black Cat.

Music

While the film's music disappointed fans of the band's more traditional pop sound, it features what some critics considered to be some of the Monkees' best-recorded work, including contributions by Carole King and Harry Nilsson. Jack Nicholson compiled the soundtrack album, which approximates the flow of the movie and includes large portions of the dialogue. The film's incidental music was composed and conducted by Ken Thorne, who also composed and conducted the incidental music to the Beatles' second film, Help! The film's most famous song, "Porpoise Song", appeared at the film's start and finish. Bright color filters heighten the visual effect and dreamlike touch of the passages, which include mermaids rescuing member Micky Dolenz in the film's start. It was a psychedelic touch — recalling some visual and musical elements used for the Beatles' television film Magical Mystery Tour and their animated feature film Yellow Submarine — and was directed by George Dunning.

Andrew Sandoval, author of The Monkees: The Day-By-Day Story of the 60s TV Pop Sensation, commented that, "It has some of their best songs on it and ...the movie's musical performances are some of the most cohesive moments in the film."

The music of the Monkees often featured a rather dark subject matter beneath a superficially bright, uplifting sound. The music of the film takes the darkness and occasional satirical elements of the Monkees' earlier tunes and makes it far more overt, as in "Ditty Diego" or "Daddy's Song", which has Jones singing an upbeat, Broadway-style number about a boy abandoned by his father. In his 2012 essay on the soundtrack album, academic Peter Mills noted that "on this album the songs are only part of the story, as they were with the Monkees project as a whole: Signals, sounds, and ideas interfere with each other throughout."

The soundtrack includes:
 "Porpoise Song" (theme) – Gerry Goffin, Carole King
 "Ditty Diego" – Bob Rafelson, Jack Nicholson
 "Circle Sky" – Michael Nesmith
 "Can You Dig It" – Peter Tork
 "As We Go Along" – Carole King, Toni Stern
 "Daddy's Song" – Harry Nilsson
 "Long Title: Do I Have to Do This All Over Again?" – Peter Tork
 Excerpts from the film, spliced in random order that is not consecutive to the film itself

Release

Marketing
Trailers summarized it as a "most extraordinary adventure, western, comedy, love story, mystery, drama, musical, documentary satire ever made (And that's putting it mildly)." There were no pictures of the Monkees on the original poster; only a picture of John Brockman, who did the PR for the film.

Head was one of the first films to be advertised with an MPAA rating, with newspaper advertisements in New York daily papers on November 1, 1968, displaying a G rating.

Another part of the promotional campaign was placing Head stickers in random places. Rafelson commented that he and Nicholson were arrested at the New York City premiere on October 6 for trying to put a sticker on a police officer's helmet as he mounted his horse.

Reception
A poor audience response at an August 1968 screening in Los Angeles eventually forced the producers to edit the picture from its original 110-minute length. The 86-minute Head premiered in New York City on November 6, 1968; the film later debuted in Hollywood on November 20. It was not a commercial success. This was in part because Head, being an antithesis of The Monkees sitcom, comprehensively demolished the group's carefully groomed public image while the older, hipper counterculture audience they had been reaching for rejected the Monkees' efforts out of hand.

The film's release also was delayed (partly because of the use of solarization, a then-new technique both laborious and expensive) and badly underpromoted. The sole television commercial was a confusing minimalist close-up shot of a man's head (John Brockman); after 30 seconds the man smiled and the name HEAD appeared on his forehead. This ad was a parody of Andy Warhol's 1964 film Blow Job, which only showed a close-up of a man's face for an extended period, supposedly receiving 'head'.

Receiving mixed critical reviews and virtually non-existent box office receipts, the film succeeded in alienating the band's teenage fanbase while failing to attract the more adult audience for which they had strived. Heads abysmal reception halted studio plans for any further films with the Monkees. It also corresponded with a steep drop in the group's popularity as recording artists; the Head soundtrack peaked at No. 45 on the U.S. chart, the first time any Monkees album had not risen to the Top 5. "Porpoise Song" was also the first single to not make the Top 40.

In her scathing review, Renata Adler of The New York Times commented: Head "might be a film to see if you have been smoking grass, or if you like to scream at the Monkees, or if you are interested in what interests drifting heads and hysterical high-school girls." She added that the group "are most interesting for their lack of similarity to The Beatles. Going through ersatz Beatle songs, and jokes and motions, their complete lack of distinction of any kind ... makes their performance modest and almost brave."

Daily Variety was also harsh, stating that "Head is an extension of the ridiculous nonsense served up on the Screen Gems vid series that manufactured the Monkees and lasted two full seasons following the same format and, ostensibly, appealing to the same kind of audience." But the review applauded Rafelson and Nicholson, saying that they "were wise not to attempt a firm storyline as the Monkees have established themselves in the art of the non sequitur and outrageous action. Giving them material they can handle is good thinking; asking them to achieve something more might have been a disaster."

Funicello said when she saw the film "it made no more sense to me than it ever had" when she read the script "but it was a challenging, offbeat role and I was happy to play it."

Home media
The film was released on September 18, 1986, on VHS, Beta, and Laserdisc. It was re-released on VHS on January 25, 1995.

It was released on DVD twice: first as an individual release on June 12, 2000, then again on December 14, 2010, as part of the Criterion Collection box set America Lost and Found: The BBS Story.

It was released on Blu-ray twice: first on November 23, 2010, as part of America Lost and Found, then again on July 8, 2016, as part of The Monkees: The Complete TV Series Blu-ray box set.

Legacy
Head has developed a cult following. Leonard Maltin describes it as "delightfully plotless" and "well worth seeing", giving the film 3 out of 4 stars, while Rotten Tomatoes gives the film a 75% rating. Head premiered on television across-the-board as a CBS Late Movie on December 30, 1974; the network rebroadcast the film on July 7, 1975. Cable TV took hold in 1981, when Head began periodic showings on Spotlight; Cinemax began airing the film in 1984. In the U.K., Channel 4 also aired it on British TV in 1986 and 1991. It was later shown regularly on Starz Cinema and in 2007, Turner Classic Movies featured the film as part of TCM Underground, showing the film unedited and in its original aspect ratio. It was released on video and Laserdisc by RCA/Columbia Pictures Home Video in September 1986, taking advantage of the group's 20th Anniversary, again on VHS and DVD by Rhino Entertainment in January 1995 and a third time on Blu-ray and DVD in November and December 2010, respectively, by the Criterion Collection, in a box set with other films from Rafelson. In honor of the Monkees' 50th anniversary, Rhino released the complete series on Blu-ray on July 8, 2016, with the film and deleted scenes.

When asked by Rolling Stone magazine in March 2012 if he thought making Head was a mistake, Nesmith responded by saying that "by the time Head came out the Monkees were a pariah. There was no confusion about this. We were on the cosine of the line of approbation, from acceptance to rejection ...and it was over. Head was a swan song. We wrote it with Jack and Bob ...and we liked it. It was an authentic representation of a phenomenon we were a part of that was winding down. It was very far from suicide even though it may have looked like that. There were some people in power, and not a few critics, who thought there was another decision that could have been made. But I believe the movie was an inevitability. There was no other movie to be made that would not have been ghastly under the circumstances." A decade earlier, in his commentary for the television series episode "Fairy Tale", Nesmith called the film the "murder" of the Monkees, an intentional move by Schneider and Rafelson, who had their eyes on bigger goals and felt that the Monkees project was holding them back. Bassist Tork echoed a similar statement during the Monkees' 2001 interview on the VH-1 series Behind the Music. Also in the 2001 interview, Davy Jones acceded to the notion that the Monkees should never have made the movie at the time.

For all of the negative remarks, there have been positive comments, showing Dolenz, whether knowingly or unknowingly, as a fashion trendsetter. In Straight Outta Cullompton, author Adam Foley wrote more glowingly, "Julian [Hewings]: 'I was watching Head, The Monkees film, and there's a bit at the beginning when Micky Dolenz falls from Golden Gate Bridge and he's got a pair of slightly flared boot cut jean cords on with a pair of (Adidas) Gazelles, probably the first ones that ever came out and this stripy t-shirt and I thought "Wow, that's what I remember when I was a kid – that's what everyone used to wear when they went to school." I just thought "Wow. Yeah. That's really speaking to me there and I got the others together" and went "Have a look at this, we're going to go out and find these clothes and that's what we're going to wear". The look came first before the music'".

On November 19, 2014, the film was screened in the United Kingdom for the first time outside London as part of the Leeds International Film Festival. It was introduced by Peter Mills of Leeds Beckett University, author of a book about the Monkees.

The NorthEast ComicCon & Collectibles Extravaganza hosted a 50th anniversary screening of the film at the Regent Theatre (Arlington, Massachusetts), on July 6, 2018. A portion of that screening benefited the Cystic Dreams Fund a 501(c)(3) non-profit organization and Dolenz conducted a lengthy question and answer before introducing the film.

See also
 The Trip, a 1967 film also written by Nicholson
 List of American films of 1968

References

Sources

External links

 
 
 
 
 The HEAD page, from The Monkees Film & TV Vault
 The Monkees' Head: 'Our fans couldn't even see it' – Dorian Lynskey, The Guardian, 28 April 2011
Head-zapoppin’! an essay by Chuck Stephens at the Criterion Collection

The Monkees
1968 films
1960s Italian-language films
1968 musical comedy films
American avant-garde and experimental films
American musical comedy films
American rock music films
American satirical films
Films about freedom of expression
Films about television
Films based on television series
Films directed by Bob Rafelson
Films shot in California
Hippie films
Mannequins in films
Films about mermaids
Films with screenplays by Jack Nicholson
Films with screenplays by Bob Rafelson
Self-reflexive films
Surrealist films
Columbia Pictures films
Psychedelic films
Films shot in Salt Lake City
Films about giants
1968 directorial debut films
Films produced by Bob Rafelson
Films scored by Ken Thorne
Films shot in the Bahamas
Films shot in Los Angeles County, California
1960s English-language films
1960s American films